N-Bromosuccinimide or NBS is a chemical reagent used in radical substitution, electrophilic addition, and electrophilic substitution reactions in organic chemistry. NBS can be a convenient source of Br•, the bromine radical.

Preparation
NBS is commercially available. It can also be synthesized in the laboratory. To do so, sodium hydroxide and bromine are added to an ice-water solution of succinimide. The NBS product precipitates and can be collected by filtration.

Crude NBS gives better yield in the Wohl-Ziegler reaction. In other cases, impure NBS (slightly yellow in color) may give unreliable results. It can be purified by recrystallization from 90 to 95 °C water (10 g of NBS for 100 mL of water).

Reactions

Addition to alkenes
NBS will react with alkenes 1 in aqueous solvents to give bromohydrins 2. The preferred conditions are the portionwise addition of NBS to a solution of the alkene in 50% aqueous DMSO, DME, THF, or tert-butanol at 0 °C. Formation of a bromonium ion and immediate attack by water gives strong Markovnikov addition and anti stereochemical selectivities.

Side reactions include the formation of α-bromoketones and dibromo compounds. These can be minimized by the use of freshly recrystallized NBS.

With the addition of nucleophiles, instead of water, various bifunctional alkanes can be synthesized.

Allylic and benzylic bromination
Standard conditions for using NBS in allylic and/or benzylic bromination involves refluxing a solution of NBS in anhydrous CCl4 with a radical initiator—usually azobisisobutyronitrile (AIBN) or benzoyl peroxide, irradiation, or both to effect radical initiation. The allylic and benzylic radical intermediates formed during this reaction are more stable than other carbon radicals and the major products are allylic and benzylic bromides. This is also called the Wohl–Ziegler reaction.

The carbon tetrachloride must be maintained anhydrous throughout the reaction, as the presence of water may likely hydrolyze the desired product. Barium carbonate is often added to maintain anhydrous and acid-free conditions.

In the above reaction, while a mixture of isomeric allylic bromide products are possible, only one is created due to the greater stability of the 4-position radical over the methyl-centered radical.

Bromination of carbonyl derivatives
NBS can α-brominate carbonyl derivatives via either a radical pathway (as above) or via acid-catalysis. For example, hexanoyl chloride 1 can be brominated in the alpha-position by NBS using acid catalysis.

The reaction of enolates, enol ethers, or enol acetates with NBS is the preferred method of α-bromination as it is high-yielding with few side-products.

Bromination of aromatic derivatives
Electron-rich aromatic compounds, such as phenols, anilines, and various aromatic heterocycles, can be brominated using NBS. Using DMF as the solvent gives high levels of para-selectivity.

Hofmann rearrangement
NBS, in the presence of a strong base, such as DBU, reacts with primary amides to produce a carbamate via the Hofmann rearrangement.

Selective oxidation of alcohols
It is uncommon, but possible for NBS to oxidize alcohols. E. J. Corey et al. found that one can selectively oxidize secondary alcohols in the presence of primary alcohols using NBS in aqueous dimethoxyethane (DME).

Oxidative decarboxylation of α-amino acids
NBS electrophilically brominates the amine, which is followed by decarboxylation and release of an imine. Further hydrolysis will yield an aldehyde and ammonia. (cf. non-oxidative PLP dependent decarboxylation)

Precautions
Although NBS is easier and safer to handle than bromine, precautions should be taken to avoid inhalation. NBS should be stored in a refrigerator. NBS will decompose over time giving off bromine. Pure NBS is white, but it is often found to be off-white or brown colored by bromine.

In general, reactions involving NBS are exothermic. Therefore, extra precautions should be taken when using on a large scale.

See also
Halohydrin formation
 N-Chlorosuccinimide
 N-Iodosuccinimide

References

External links
 Usage of N-bromosuccinimide in organic synthesis
 Reactions with NBS

Organobromides
Reagents for organic chemistry
Succinimides